The 2021 Indianapolis 8 Hours was an endurance race held on 17 October 2021 at the Indianapolis Motor Speedway in Speedway, in Indiana, United States. The event was open to cars in GT classes, namely GT3 and GT4. It was the second running of the Indianapolis 8 Hour. It was also the second leg of the 2021 Intercontinental GT Challenge and the seventh and final race of the 2021 GT World Challenge America. The GT World Challenge America results were determined by the race results after three hours instead of the full eight hours.

The race was run on the SCCA Runoffs layout, not the INDYCAR Grand Prix layout as was done the previous year, as it was made necessary as a result of kerbing damage in the Turn 5-6 chicane during the Verizon 200 NASCAR-INDYCAR meeting. The Runoffs course utilised the old Formula One course with the newer Snake Pit section.

Class structure 
Cars competed in the following two GT classes.
 GT3 Cars
 GT4 Cars

Entry List

Qualifying

Qualifying results 
Pole positions in each class are denoted in bold.

Race Result 

References

External links
 
 

Indianapolis